Nasonville may refer to:

Nasonville, Rhode Island
Nasonville, Wisconsin